Brush with Fate is a television film debuted on February 2, 2003, on CBS. It followed the life of an imaginary painting by Dutch painter Johannes Vermeer as it passes through the hands of various people. The film was based on Girl In Hyacinth Blue, the 1999 novel by author Susan Vreeland, and starred  Glenn Close and Ellen Burstyn.
The imaginary painting Girl in Hyacinth Blue, the principal object in this film, is painted exactly in Vermeer's painting technique by the American master painter Jonathan Janson, author and webmaster of the world-known website about the life and work of Johannes Vermeer "Essential Vermeer".

Plot

Richard is a new art teacher at a high school. Cornelia Englebrecht (played by Glenn Close) is a history teacher who invites Richard to see a painting of a young girl at a table, which she believes to be a genuine Vermeer, where she tells him stories, which are portrayed as flashbacks about the people who owned the painting in the past. All of the stories take place in the Netherlands, and the flashbacks happen mostly before the one preceding it. The first story, from the late 1800s, involved a romance and had flashbacks within flashbacks. Another story took place in the early 1700s when a baby was abandoned during a flood after a dike break. The painting accompanied the baby and was intended to be sold for the baby's expenses.

In the next story, a man left a university to take a job working with the machinery used for the dikes. He got interested in a servant girl who was punished by being put in stocks. It is revealed in this story where the baby came from.

The next story was very brief, and in it, a woman, who was unsuccessful in bidding for the painting at an auction, seemed to know more about the painting than the auctioneer. The next story revealed how Vermeer came to paint the girl's picture.
Finally, Cornelia tells us how she came in possession of the painting.

Tagline: "A mystery hidden for generations. Now the truth will finally be revealed."

Cast 
 Ellen Burstyn – Rika
 Glenn Close – Cornelia Englebrecht
 Thomas Gibson – Richard
 Phyllida Law – Maria
 Kelly Macdonald – Aletta
 Ger Apeldoorn – Man in Black
 Patrick Bergin
 Kieran Bew – Adrian
 Daniël Boissevain – Sol
 Horace Cohen – Faculty Man
 Jenne Decleir – Young Laurens
 Katja Herbers – Tanneke
 Marcel Jonker – Willem
 Hugo Konings – Young Man
 Caro Lenssen – Joanna
 Roef Ragas – Stijn
 Thekla Reuten – Saskia
 Erik van Beekum – Angry dike worker
 Erwan van Buuren – Fritz
 Laurien Van den Broeck – Magdalena
 Carly Wijs – Faculty Woman

References

External links 
 

2003 television films
2003 films
Television shows based on American novels
CBS network films
Hallmark Hall of Fame episodes